This is a list of notable hard rock musicians.

N

Nazareth
Nelson
Neon Rose
Neurotic Outsiders
New York Dolls
Nickelback
Night Ranger
Nirvana
Nite City
Ted Nugent

O

 Of Mice & Men
Osmi putnik
Osvajači
Ozzy Osbourne
The Outpatience

P

Jimmy Page
Ian Paice
A Perfect Circle
Petra
Phantom Blue
Robert Plant
P.O.D.
Poison
Iggy Pop
Pop Mašina
The Power Station
Pražský výběr
pre)Thing

Q

Quartz
Suzi Quatro
Queen
Queen City Kids
Queens of the Stone Age
Quiet Riot

R

Rabbit
Rage Against the Machine
Rainbow
Ram Jam
Ramatam
Rare Earth
Ratt
Red Rider
Resurrection Band
REO Speedwagon
Rhino Bucket
Randy Rhoads
Riot
The Rockets
Paul Rodgers
The Rolling Stones
Axl Rose
Rose Tattoo
The Runaways
Rush
Mitch Ryder

S

Saigon Kick
Saraya
Scorpions
The Screaming Jets
Bob Seger
The Seeds
The Sensational Alex Harvey Band
Sharks
Shihad
Shinedown
Gene Simmons
Skid Row
Slade
Slipknot
Spooky Tooth
Bruce Springsteen
Billy Squier
Starchild
Status Quo
Steeler
Steppenwolf
Stone Temple Pilots
The Stooges
Strapps
Streetheart
Stryper
Surgery
Survivor
The Sweet
John Sykes

T

T. Rex
Michael Tait 
Teška Industrija
Tesla
Therapy?
Thin Lizzy
Tin Machine
Toad
Toronto
Triumph
Robin Trower
Trust
Tucky Buzzard
Joe Lynn Turner
Twisted Sister
Steven Tyler

U

UFO
Union
Uriah Heep

V

Valient Thorr
Van Halen
Vandale
Vandenberg
Vanilla Fudge
Velvet Revolver
Vixen
Volbeat

W

Dick Wagner
Joe Walsh
Whitesnake
The Who
Widowmaker
Wild Cherries 
Winger
Wolfmother

Y

The Yardbirds
Yesterday's Children

Z

Zephyr
ZZ Top

See also
List of hard rock musicians (A–M)

References

Bibliography

Hard Rock 02